Tony Rogers (born 30 April 1957, in Huntly) is a retired middle distance runner from New Zealand, who represented his native country in the men's 1,500 metres at the 1984 Summer Olympics, finishing in ninth place. He also competed at the 1982 Commonwealth Games, and later became High Performance Manager for Athletics New Zealand.

References

New Zealand Olympic Committee

1957 births
Living people
New Zealand male middle-distance runners
Athletes (track and field) at the 1982 Commonwealth Games
Athletes (track and field) at the 1984 Summer Olympics
Olympic athletes of New Zealand
Sportspeople from Huntly, New Zealand
New Zealand referees and umpires
Commonwealth Games competitors for New Zealand